This is the list of FIPS codes for Georgia — FIPS codes for each county in the state. - Weatheradios with WRSAME can also use these codes (prefixed with a 0).

13000 - Georgia (entire state)
13001 - Appling County
13003 - Atkinson County
13005 - Bacon County
13007 - Baker County
13009 - Baldwin County
13011 - Banks County
13013 - Barrow County
13015 - Bartow County
13017 - Ben Hill County
13019 - Berrien County
13021 - Bibb County
13023 - Bleckley County
13025 - Brantley County
13027 - Brooks County
13029 - Bryan County
13031 - Bulloch County
13033 - Burke County
13035 - Butts County
13037 - Calhoun County
13039 - Camden County
(13041 - former Campbell County)
13043 - Candler County
13045 - Carroll County
13047 - Catoosa County
13049 - Charlton County
13051 - Chatham County
13053 - Chattahoochee County
13055 - Chattooga County
13057 - Cherokee County
13059 - Clarke County
13061 - Clay County
13063 - Clayton County
13065 - Clinch County
13067 - Cobb County
13069 - Coffee County
13071 - Colquitt County
13073 - Columbia County
13075 - Cook County
13077 - Coweta County
13079 - Crawford County
13081 - Crisp County
13083 - Dade County
13085 - Dawson County
13087 - Decatur County
13089 - DeKalb County
13091 - Dodge County
13093 - Dooly County
13095 - Dougherty County
13097 - Douglas County
13099 - Early County
13101 - Echols County
13103 - Effingham County
13105 - Elbert County
13107 - Emanuel County
13109 - Evans County
13111 - Fannin County
13113 - Fayette County
13115 - Floyd County
13117 - Forsyth County
13119 - Franklin County
13121 - Fulton County
13123 - Gilmer County
13125 - Glascock County
13127 - Glynn County
13129 - Gordon County
13131 - Grady County
13133 - Greene County
13135 - Gwinnett County
13137 - Habersham County
13139 - Hall County
13141 - Hancock County
13143 - Haralson County
13145 - Harris County
13147 - Hart County
13149 - Heard County
13151 - Henry County
13153 - Houston County
13155 - Irwin County
13157 - Jackson County
13159 - Jasper County
13161 - Jeff Davis County
13163 - Jefferson County
13165 - Jenkins County
13167 - Johnson County
13169 - Jones County
13171 - Lamar County
13173 - Lanier County
13175 - Laurens County
13177 - Lee County
13179 - Liberty County
13181 - Lincoln County
13183 - Long County
13185 - Lowndes County
13187 - Lumpkin County
13189 - McDuffie County
13191 - McIntosh County
13193 - Macon County
13195 - Madison County
13197 - Marion County
13199 - Meriwether County
13201 - Miller County
(13203 - former Milton County)
13205 - Mitchell County
13207 - Monroe County
13209 - Montgomery County
13211 - Morgan County
13213 - Murray County
13215 - Muscogee County*
13217 - Newton County
13219 - Oconee County
13221 - Oglethorpe County
13223 - Paulding County
13225 - Peach County
13227 - Pickens County
13229 - Pierce County
13231 - Pike County
13233 - Polk County
13235 - Pulaski County
13237 - Putnam County
13239 - Quitman County
13241 - Rabun County
13243 - Randolph County
13245 - Richmond County
13247 - Rockdale County
13249 - Schley County
13251 - Screven County
13253 - Seminole County
13255 - Spalding County
13257 - Stephens County
13259 - Stewart County
13261 - Sumter County
13263 - Talbot County
13265 - Taliaferro County
13267 - Tattnall County
13269 - Taylor County
13271 - Telfair County
13273 - Terrell County
13275 - Thomas County
13277 - Tift County
13279 - Toombs County
13281 - Towns County
13283 - Treutlen County
13285 - Troup County
13287 - Turner County
13289 - Twiggs County
13291 - Union County
13293 - Upson County
13295 - Walker County
13297 - Walton County
13299 - Ware County
13301 - Warren County
13303 - Washington County
13305 - Wayne County
13307 - Webster County
13309 - Wheeler County
13311 - White County
13313 - Whitfield County
13315 - Wilcox County
13317 - Wilkes County
13319 - Wilkinson County
13321 - Worth County
13510 - Columbus*

 *Note that Columbus is not an independent city as the number suggests.  It is a consolidated city-county with Muscogee County, incorporating everything outside of Fort Benning.

Georgia (U.S. state)
FIPS codes